In human mitochondrial genetics, Haplogroup Z is a human mitochondrial DNA (mtDNA) haplogroup.

Origin
Haplogroup Z is believed to have arisen in Central Asia, and is a descendant of haplogroup CZ.

Distribution
The greatest clade diversity of haplogroup Z is found in East Asia and Central Asia.  However, its greatest frequency appears in some peoples of Russia, such as Evens from Kamchatka (8/39 Z1a2a, 3/39 Z1a3, 11/39 = 28.2% Z total) and from Berezovka, Srednekolymsky District, Sakha Republic (3/15 Z1a3, 1/15 Z1a2a, 4/15 = 26.7% Z total), and among the Saami people of northern Scandinavia. With the exception of three Khakasses who belong to Z4, two Yakut who belong to Z3a1, two Yakut, a Yakutian Evenk, a Buryat, and an Altai Kizhi who belong to Z3(xZ3a, Z3c), and the presence of the Z3c clade among populations of Altai Republic, nearly all members of haplogroup Z in North Asia and Europe belong to subclades of Z1. The TMRCA of Z1 is 20,400 [95% CI 7,400 <-> 34,000] ybp according to Sukernik et al. 2012, 20,400 [95% CI 7,800 <-> 33,800] ybp according to Fedorova et al. 2013, or 19,600 [95% CI 12,500 <-> 29,300] ybp according to YFull. Among the members (Z1, Z2, Z3, Z4, and Z7) of haplogroup Z, Nepalese populations were characterized by rare clades Z3a1a and Z7, of which Z3a1a was the most frequent sub-clade in Newar, with a frequency of 16.5%. Z3, found in East Asia, North Asia, and MSEA, is the oldest member of haplogroup Z with an estimated age of ~ 25.4 Kya.  Haplogroup Z3a1a is also detected in other Nepalese populations, such as Magar (5.4%), Tharu, Kathmandu (mixed population) and Nepali-other (mixed population from Kathmandu and Eastern Nepal). S6).  Z3a1a1 detected in Tibet, Myanmar, Nepal, India, Thai-Laos and Vietnam trace their ancestral roots to China with a coalescent age of ~ 8.4 Kya

Fedorova et al. 2013 have reported finding Z*(xZ1a, Z3, Z4) in 1/388 Turks and 1/491 Kazakhs. These individuals should belong to Z1* (elsewhere observed in a Tofalar), Z2 (observed in Japanese), Z7 (observed in the Himalaya), Z5 (observed in Japanese), or basal Z* (observed in a Blang individual in Northern Thailand).

Subclades

Tree
This phylogenetic tree of haplogroup Z subclades is based on the paper by Mannis van Oven and Manfred Kayser Updated comprehensive phylogenetic tree of global human mitochondrial DNA variation and subsequent published research.

CZ
Z
Z* – Thailand (Blang in Chiang Rai Province)
Z5 – Japan (Aichi)
Z-T152C! (TMRCA 24,300 [95% CI 19,300 <-> 30,300] ybp)
Z-T152C!* – Hong Kong
Z1 (TMRCA 18,600 [95% CI 10,900 <-> 29,500] ybp)
Z1a – Koryak, Buryat, Kalmyk, Khakas, Shor, Altai Kizhi, Kazakh, Kyrgyz, Uyghur, Turk, Arab (Uzbekistan) (TMRCA 7,600 [95% CI 5,100 <-> 10,900] ybp)
Z1a1 – Italy, Hungary (ancient Avar), Germany, Sweden, Kazakh, Uyghur, Buryat (TMRCA 5,600 [95% CI 2,500 <-> 10,900] ybp)
Z1a1a – Khakas, Nogai, Udmurt, Russia (Krasnodar Krai, etc.), Abazin, Cherkessian, Finland, Norway, Sweden, Estonia, Ukrainian
Z1a1a* – Norway (Vest-Agder, Aust-Agder), Finland, Sami (Västerbotten, Norrbotten), Komi, Russia (Chelyabinsk Oblast), Ket (lower Yenisey River basin) 
Z1a1a1 – Russia (Chelyabinsk Oblast)
Z1a1a2 – Udmurt
Z1a1a3 – Russia (Chelyabinsk Oblast, Novgorod Oblast), Poland
Z1a1a4 – Finland (Eastern Finland Province), Estonia (Rapla County)
Z1a1b – Evenk (Sakha Republic), Dolgan
Z1a1b* – Nganasan (Taimyr Peninsula), Yukaghir (lower Indigirka River basin), Even (Sakkyryyr, Eveno-Bytantaysky National district or Momsky district of Sakha Republic), Evenk (Iengra River basin, Nyukzha river basin)
Z1a1b1
Z1a1b1* – Buryat (Irkutsk Oblast)
Z1a1b1a – Uyghur
Z1a2 (TMRCA 5,400 [95% CI 2,400 <-> 10,400] ybp)
Z1a2* – Ulchi (lower Amur River basin)
Z1a2a – Itelmen, Koryak
Z1a2a* – Even (Kamchatka), Yukaghir (upper Anadyr River basin)
Z1a2a1
Z1a2a1* – Even (Kamchatka, Berezovka)
Z1a2a1a – Even (Kamchatka), Evenk (village of Nelkan by the Maya River in the Okhotsk Region)
Z1a3 (TMRCA 3,600 [95% CI 1,850 <-> 6,500] ybp)
Z1a3* – Yukaghir (upper Anadyr River basin), Even (Tompo District, Eveno-Bytantaysky National district or Momsky district of Sakha Republic), Evenk (Nyukzha River basin), Yakut (central Yakutia)
Z1a3a
Z1a3a* – Even (Kamchatka)
Z1a3a1 – Yukaghir (lower Kolyma River basin), Even (Berezovka)
Z1a3b – Even (Berezovka), Yakut
Z1a4 (TMRCA 5,500 [95% CI 3,200 <-> 9,000] ybp)
Z1a4* – Uyghur, Tubalar, Buryat (Irkutsk Oblast)
Z1a4a – Uyghur
Z1b – Tofalar
Z2 – Japan (Tokyo, Aichi, etc.) (TMRCA 3,900 [95% CI 1,450 <-> 8,400] ybp)
Z3 – Japan (Tokyo), South Korea, China, Singapore, Malaysia, Thailand (Lao Isan in Chaiyaphum Province), Vietnam, Uyghur, Evenk (Sakha Republic), Buryat, Altai Kizhi, Kyrgyz, Kazakh, Tajik, Azerbaijan, North Ossetian, Romania, USA (TMRCA 21,000 [95% CI 17,200 <-> 25,300] ybp)
Z3a – China (Xibo, Deng, etc.), Kazakh (TMRCA 12,900 [95% CI 9,000 <-> 18,000] ybp)
Z3a1
Z3a1a
Z3a1a - Nepal (Newar, Magar, Tharu, Eastern Nepal, Kathmandu)
Z3a1a* – Lachungpa, Lepcha
Z3a1a1 – China
Z3a1a2 – Gallong, Dirang Monpa, Thailand (Khon Mueang in Mae Hong Son Province), Vietnam (Hà Nhì)
Z3a1b – Yakut
Z3a2 – Lachungpa
Z3a2a – Lachungpa
Z3a3 – Thailand (Palaung in Chiang Mai Province, Lawa in Mae Hong Son Province)
Z3b – Deng, Gallong (TMRCA 8,400 [95% CI 2,300 <-> 21,500] ybp)
Z-G709A – Yakut, China (Han from Beijing)
Z3c – Altaian, Altai Kizhi, Iran, Kyrgyz (Tashkurgan), Japan (Tokyo), Vietnam
Z3d – China (Han from Beijing, etc.), Taiwan (Minnan, etc.), Mongol (Inner Mongolia), Korea
Z3e – China, Korea
Z3e1 - China
Z3f – China, She people (China), Korea, Hazara
Z3g - Uyghur (China), Hazara (Pakistan)
Z4 – China (Suzhou, etc.), Thailand (Phuan in Suphan Buri Province), Philippines, Uzbekistan, Kazakhstan, Kalmyk, Khakas, Karanogai (TMRCA 14,900 [95% CI 9,200 <-> 22,800] ybp)
Z4a – China (Han from Hunan and Denver, etc.), Uyghur, Daur, Japan (Tokyo)
Z4a1 – China (Han from Wuhan)
Z4a1a – China (Han from Hunan and Yunnan), Vietnam
Z4a1a1 – Japan (Tokyo, etc.), South Korea
Z7 – Dirang Monpa, Tibet (Tingri, Shannan) (TMRCA 1,750 [95% CI 275 <-> 6,200] ybp), Nepal (Newar)
Z8*  – Nepal (Newar)

See also 

Genealogical DNA test
Genetic genealogy
Human mitochondrial genetics
Population genetics
Human mitochondrial DNA haplogroups

References

External links 
General
Ian Logan's Mitochondrial DNA Site
Mannis van Oven's Phylotree
Haplogroup Z
Spread of Haplogroup Z, from National Geographic

Z
mtDNA